Rivière des Hurons may refer to:

 Rivière des Hurons (Richelieu River tributary), in Saint-Mathias-sur-Richelieu, Montérégie, Quebec, Canada
 Rivière des Hurons (Saint-Charles Lake), a river in Stoneham-et-Tewkesbury, La Jacques-Cartier Regional County Municipality, Capitale-Nationale, Quebec, Canada

See also

Huron River (rivière du Chêne tributary), Chaudière-Appalaches, Quebec, Canada
Huron River (disambiguation)
Huron (disambiguation)